Wemaers-Cappel is a commune in the Nord department in northern France.

Heraldry

Population

See also
Communes of the Nord department

References

Wemaerscappel
French Flanders